The 23rd South African Parliament was the second Parliament of South Africa since the introduction of non-racial government in South Africa in 1994. It was elected in the 2 June, 1999 general election, and was opened by newly-elected president Thabo Mbeki's State of the Nation address in a joint sitting on 14 June 1999. It held its final session in early 2004, before the April 2004 elections.

See also 

 List of members of the National Assembly of South Africa, 1999–2004
 List of members of the Senate of South Africa, 1999–2004

References 

23rd South African Parliament